Giovanni Battista Monti (1607–1657) was a Roman Catholic prelate who served as Bishop of San Severo (1655–1657).

Biography
Giovanni Battista Monti was born in 1607 in Ferrandina, Italy.
On 11 Oct 1655, he was appointed during the papacy of Pope Alexander VII as Bishop of San Severo.
On 17 Oct 1655, he was consecrated bishop Federico Sforza, Cardinal-Deacon of Santi Vito, Modesto e Crescenzia, with Giovanni Francesco Passionei, Bishop of Pesaro, and Michele Angelo Vincentini, Bishop of Gerace, serving as co-consecrators. 
He served as Bishop of San Severo until his death in 1657.

References

External links and additional sources
 (for Chronology of Bishops) 
 (for Chronology of Bishops) 

17th-century Italian Roman Catholic bishops
Bishops appointed by Pope Alexander VII
1607 births
1657 deaths